Sakai is a city in Osaka Prefecture, Japan

Sakai may also refer to:

Ethnic groups
Sakai is a term historically used to refer to indigenous ethnic groups of the Malay peninsula and Sumatra, including:

Orang Asli, the indigenous peoples of peninsular Malaysia
Senoi, an indigenous people of the northern Malay Peninsula, a subgroup of Orang Asli
Maniq people, an indigenous group in southern Thailand
Sakai (Indonesia), one of the tribes in Riau, Indonesia

Person names
Sakai (name), Japanese surnames written with various kanji
Sakai clan, a Japanese clan

Places
Sakai, Fukui, a city in Fukui Prefecture, Japan
Sakai District, Fukui, a district in Fukui Prefecture, Japan, that was dissolved in 2006
Sakai, Fukui (town), a neighborhood of present-day Sakai city, Fukui
Sakai, Gunma, a former town in Gunma Prefecture, Japan
Sakai, Ibaraki, a town in Ibaraki Prefecture, Japan
Sakai, Nagano, a village in Nagano Prefecture, Japan

Transportation
Sakai Line, a railway line of West Japan Railway Company between Yonago and Sakaiminato in Tottori Prefecture, Japan
Sakai Station, a train station on the Nankai Main Line in Sakai, Osaka Prefecture, Japan

Other uses
Sakai (software), a web application and learning management system for education

See also
 Saikai, Nagasaki, a city with a similar-sounding name in Nagasaki, Japan
 Macario Sakay (1878-1907), Filipino general
 Sekai (disambiguation)